Gabo Island is a  island located off the coast of eastern Victoria, Australia, between Mallacoota and Cape Howe on the border with New South Wales. Gabo Island is a shipping reference commonly referred to in Victorian weather warnings issued by the Australian Bureau of Meteorology. The island is an unincorporated area under the direct administration of the government of Victoria.

Gabo Island Lighthouse

Gabo Island is well known for its historic lighthouse. This lighthouse, Australia's second tallest, was completed in 1862 and made from pink granite quarried from the island itself. A keeper's house is occupied by a caretaker; another building may be rented for overnight stays.

Climate
Gabo Island has a moderate oceanic climate (Cfb) with mild summers and cool winters and rainfall spread throughout the year. The island features 60.8 clear days annually, higher than Melbourne's 48.6 days.

Birds
The island is home to the world's second largest colony of little penguins.
Gabo and nearby Tullaberga Island have been identified by BirdLife International as an Important Bird Area because of the numbers of breeding penguins (up to 21,000 pairs) and white-faced storm petrels (up to 20,000 pairs).
Concern of predation of native birds and animals led to a successful feral cat eradication program on the island between 1987 and 1991.

Literary references
“The wind that blows by Gabo,” is the title of a poem by E.J. Brady.

References

External links

 The Great Penguin Count on Gabo Island

Unincorporated areas of Victoria (Australia)
1862 establishments in Australia
Gippsland (region)
Important Bird Areas of Victoria (Australia)
Islands of Victoria (Australia)
Seabird colonies
Penguin colonies